Roderick "Rody" Falesca Renee Trygvae Rijnders (1 March 1941 – 15 January 2018) was a coxswain from the Netherlands. He won the silver medal in the coxed pairs at the 1968 Summer Olympics, alongside Hadriaan van Nes and Herman Suselbeek, as well a European bronze in 1965.

References

1941 births
2018 deaths
Dutch male rowers
Rowers at the 1968 Summer Olympics
Olympic rowers of the Netherlands
Olympic silver medalists for the Netherlands
Coxswains (rowing)
Olympic medalists in rowing
People from Balikpapan
Sportspeople from East Kalimantan
Medalists at the 1968 Summer Olympics
European Rowing Championships medalists